Kallambella is a village in Tumkur district of Karnataka state.

Situated at a distance of 36 km north of Tumkur, off the National Highway 48.

A large tank, supposed to have been built by 'Holampayya', is the main attraction of the place. This tank acts as a reservoir for the Hemavati river waters, on their way to Sira tank.

Crops
Rice, Arecanut, Ragi, and Groundnuts are the main crops grown here.

See also
Hagalavadi
Bukkapatna

References 

Villages in Tumkur district